Consumer-to-business (C2B) is a business model in which consumers (individuals) create value and businesses consume that value. For example, when a consumer writes reviews or when a consumer gives a useful idea for new product development then that consumer is creating value for the business if the business adopts the input. In the C2B model, a reverse auction or demand collection model, enables buyers to name or demand their own price, which is often binding, for a specific good or service. Inside of a consumer to business market the roles involved in the transaction must be established and the consumer must offer something of value to the business.

Another form of C2B is the electronic commerce business model in which consumers can offer products and services to companies, and the companies pay the consumers. This business model is a complete reversal of the traditional business model in which companies offer goods and services to consumers (business-to-consumer = B2C).  We can see the C2B model at work in blogs or internet forums in which the author offers a link back to an online business thereby facilitating the purchase of a product (like a book on Amazon.com), for which the author might receive affiliate revenues from a successful sale. Elance was the first C2B model e-commerce site.

Overview
C2B is a kind of economic relationship that is qualified as an inverted business type. The advent of the C2B scheme is due to:

 The internet connecting large groups of people to a bidirectional network; the large traditional media outlets are one-directional relationships whereas the internet is bidirectional.
 Decreasing costs of technology; individuals now have access to technologies that were once only available to large companies (digital printing and acquisition technology, high-performance computers, and powerful software).

Positives and negatives 
Nowadays people have smartphones or connect to the internet through personal tablets/computers daily allowing consumers to engage with brands online. According to Katherine Arline, in traditional consumer-to-business models companies would promote goods and services to consumers, but a shift has occurred to allow consumers to be the driving force behind a transaction. To the consumers benefit, reverse auctions occur in consumer to business markets allowing the consumer to name their price for a product or service. A consumer can also provide value to a business by offering to promote a business products on a consumers blog or social media platforms. Businesses are provided value through their consumers and vice versa. Businesses gain in C2B from the consumers willingness to negotiate price, contribute data, or market to the company. Consumers profit from direct payment of the reduced-price goods and services and the flexibility of the transaction the C2B market created. Consumer to business markets have their downfall as well. C2B is still a relatively new business practice and has not been fully studied.

One weakness of the consumer-business model is that consumer information and privacy could be compromised. For example, businesses might choose to secretly analyze consumer spending by using sensitive information such as purchase history, age, race, location, etc.

Distinguishing between traditional business models 
Consumer to business is an up and coming business market that can be utilized as a company's entire business model or added to an already existing model. Consumer to business (C2B) is the opposite of business to consumer (B2C) practices and is facilitated by the internet or online forms of technology. Another important distinction between the traditional business to consumer market is that the consumer chooses to be a part of the business relationship inside a consumer to business market. For a relationship to exist though both parties must acknowledge that it exists, implying that the relationship is important to both participants.

Data and analytics are going to drive the C2B world and enable companies to gain a better understanding of customers. Businesses need to go back to what drives the sales, people. Move away from innovation and the newest technology and go back to who, what, and why of the people interacting with businesses.

Usage in technology 
The technology industry has largely adopted the use of consumer-to-business strategies, with social media corporations taking a large part in that growth. For example, companies such as Yelp or TripAdvisor provide a C2B service due to the amount of personal data harvested for use in targeting possible advertising clients. C2B can also be theorized, in the case of review aggregators, to increase the revenue of businesses through more overall knowledge about the company at hand. For example, if a corporation receives many positive reviews on a website such as Yelp, it may help to drive traffic to the company.

Data aggregation 
Aggregation of data is a common C2B practice done with many internet corporations. In this instance, the consumer is creating the value of personal information and data to better target them to the correct advertisers. Businesses such as Facebook, Twitter, and others utilize this information in an effort to facilitate their B2B transactions with advertisers. Most of these systems cannot be fully utilized without B2C or B2B transactions, as C2B is usually the facilitator of these.

See also
Business-to-consumer
Business-to-government
Consumer-to-consumer
e-Business
Business-to-business (B2B)

References 

Business models
Consumer behaviour